The canton of Mormant is a French former administrative division, located in the arrondissement of Melun, in the Seine-et-Marne département (Île-de-France région). It was disbanded following the French canton reorganisation which came into effect in March 2015. It consisted of 22 communes, which joined the canton of Nangis in 2015.

Demographics

Composition 
The canton of Mormant was composed of 22 communes:

Andrezel
Argentières
Aubepierre-Ozouer-le-Repos
Beauvoir
Bombon
Bréau
Champdeuil
Champeaux
La Chapelle-Gauthier
Clos-Fontaine
Courtomer
Crisenoy
Fontenailles
Fouju
Grandpuits-Bailly-Carrois
Guignes
Mormant
Quiers
Saint-Méry
Saint-Ouen-en-Brie
Verneuil-l'Étang
Yèbles

See also
Cantons of the Seine-et-Marne department
Communes of the Seine-et-Marne department

References

Mormant
2015 disestablishments in France
States and territories disestablished in 2015